Ponticaulis koreensis is a Gram-negative, aerobic, obligately halophilic, chemoorganotrophic and motile bacterium from the genus of Ponticaulis which has been isolated from seawater from the coast of Jeju in Korea.

References 

Caulobacterales
Bacteria described in 2009